The 2000 Speedway Grand Prix was the 55th edition of the official World Championship to determine the world champion rider. It was the sixth season in the Speedway Grand Prix era and was used to determine the Speedway World Champion.

Event format 

The system first used in 1998 continued to be adopted with 24 riders, divided into two classes. The eight best would be directly qualified for the "Main Event", while the sixteen others would be knocked out if they finished out of the top two in 4-man heats on two occasions – while they would go through if they finished inside the top two on two occasions. This resulted in 10 heats, where eight proceeded to the Main Event, where exactly the same system was applied to give eight riders to a semi-final.

The semi-finals were then two heats of four, where the top two qualified for a final and the last two going towards the consolation final. The 4 finalists scored 25, 20, 18 and 16 points, with 5th to 8th scoring 15, 14, 12 and 10-point, and after that 8, 8, 7, 7, etc. Places after 8th place were awarded according to the time a rider was knocked out and, secondly, according to position in the last heat he rode in.

Qualification 

The 2000 season had 22 permanent riders and two wild cards at each event. The permanent riders are highlighted in the results table below.

Calendar

Final standings

References

External links 
 Official Speedway GP site

 
2000
World I